Logan Nelson (born November 11, 1996) is an American composer who has composed scores for films, video games, and modern dance productions. In 2018, he received the SABAM Award for Best Young International Composer by the World Soundtrack Academy. He is known for his work with Kris Bowers, where he composed additional music on the scores to Green Book, Dear White People and For the People.

Life and education 
Nelson was born and raised in Wichita, Kansas. In his early years, he "fell in love with" the viola and studied piano and composition with local professors. Nelson attended the University of Southern California where he majored in Music Composition and minored in Cinematic Arts. At USC, he studied music composition with Ted Hearne and film scoring with Garry Schyman; Nelson worked closely with the Glorya Kaufman School of Dance and a solo violinist to "sample unique and interesting violin textures that [he] later produced into electronic elements" in collaboration with student choreographers, the project concluded with two performances.

Nelson worked on over 30 original short film scores at USC. His score for Pepper was named Best Original Score by the NYC Indie Film Awards.

Career 
In his first summer in Los Angeles, Nelson was offered a prestigious position as an assistant for film composer Hans Zimmer's, Remote Control Productions. Following this, he began working as the composition assistant for Kris Bowers. With Bowers, Nelson assisted on the scores to television projects like Dear White People (TV series) and For the People (2018 TV series). Additionally, Nelson wrote additional music with Bowers on the Sundance Film Festival selection, Monsters and Men, as well as the Tribeca Film Festival selection, Unstoppable. His most recent project with Bowers was Green Book (film).

Logan just finished collaborating with documentary filmmaker Renan Ozturk on a piece with National Geographic and Sony about Mt. Everest. He recently scored the romantic comedy, Straight Up. The film was produced by Valparaiso Pictures and stars actress Katie Findlay.

Nelson also produces music for the synth-pop duo, LightHouse. Their song, Nebula, was described by NEST HQ (Owsla) as "mature, highly-refined synth-pop brilliantly contrasting bright, summery sounds with ghostly, melancholy vocal harmonies and a dark, echoing flair to the production." LightHouse was just featured in FLAUNT Magazine.

Awards and honors 

 Winner, SABAM Award for Best Young International Composer, 2018
 Winner, National YoungArts Foundation, 2015 and 2016

References

External links 

Logan Nelson on Instagram
Logan Nelson on Twitter
Official Website

1996 births
American film score composers
Record producers from Kansas
American television composers
Living people
American male film score composers
Male television composers